"Strike It Up" is a song by Italian music group Black Box. It was the fifth single from their debut studio album, Dreamland (1990), and was released on 6 February 1991 in many countries worldwide. The single was a success on many charts, including the Billboard Hot 100 in the United States, where it peaked at number eight. It also topped the Billboard Dance Club Songs chart in June 1991 for one week. In the United Kingdom, it peaked at number 16 on the UK Singles Chart. "Strike It Up" also was a top-10 hit in Denmark, Greece, Ireland, and the Netherlands. And on the Eurochart Hot 100, the track reached number 38.

In 2020, Slant Magazine ranked the song number 35 in its list of "The 100 Best Dance Songs of All Time".

Background
The song features an un-credited Martha Wash on lead vocals. However, Wash was not featured in the music video or singles cover art as it was customary for Katrin Quinol, a French model, to be used as the 'face' of the group, and it was her that was featured lip-synching the lyrics sung by Wash. In 1990, after suing over false advertising, Wash reached an out-of-court settlement with Black Box record label RCA, with financial compensation and a guarantee of proper credit in the future.

Critical reception
Larry Flick from Billboard wrote, "Not even the litigation alleging Martha Wash is the actual singer of group's hits can cool interest in this Italo-house act. Busy rave bears marks similar to previous hits, with a cute (and uncredited) rap adding a street vibe." The Daily Vault's Michael R. Smith wrote in his retrospective review of Dreamland, that "Strike It Up" and "Everybody Everybody" "are definitely the best of the album. These are gay disco anthems that still resonate today, even though the words aren't always easy to comprehend." Dave Sholin from the Gavin Report reported, "Back in the batter's box with a dynamic dance entry featuring the exceptional vocals of Martha Wash, they jump 24-15 at HOT 97 New York where APD/MD Kevin McCabe proclaims it, "one of our secret weapon records." 

Andrew Smith from Melody Maker called it "a commendably rootsy house pumper". Alan Jones from Music Week named it Pick of the Week, stating that it has the "usual enrgetic vocal delivery from Martha Wash nicely counterpointed by Stepz's rap. Should strike deep into the Top 40." Davydd Chong from Record Mirror said, "Needless to say, this is hedonism-a-go-go, slapped onto a seven-inch lump of plastic by the Italian mob. Dead groovy, though not as smart as 'Everybody'. I like it lots." Marc Andrews from Smash Hits declared the song as "pure disco magic".

Music video
The accompanying music video for "Strike it Up" was directed by Neil Thompson.

Impact and legacy
This song has been played during the final TV timeout in the third period at every New York Rangers home game since at least 1996. It is during this song that Rangers fan Larry Goodman, also known as "Dancing Larry," performs his signature dance, to energize the crowd.

In 2010, Pitchfork included the song in their list of "Ten Actually Good 90s Jock Jams".

In 2017, BuzzFeed ranked "Strike It Up" number 57 in its list of "The 101 Greatest Dance Songs of the '90s".

In 2020, Slant Magazine ranked the song at number 35 in its list of "The 100 Best Dance Songs of All Time". It added that "it can be guiltlessly admitted that 'Strike It Up' is a masterpiece, and it's hard to imagine anyone else's voice [than Martha Wash] rising above the song's battalion of piano house, synth stabs, and, yes, one gigantic 4/4 beat."

Track listing and formats

7" single
"Strike It Up" (DJ Lelewel mix) – 5:05
"Strike It Up" (Sensitive Mix) – 3:35

12" maxi
"Strike It Up" (Original Mix) – 5:58
"Strike It Up" (DJ Lelewel Mix) – 5:05
"Strike It Up" (Hardcore Remix) – 3:20

CD maxi
"Strike It Up" (Radio Edit) – 3:30
"Strike It Up" (Sensitive Mix) – 3:35
"Strike It Up" (Original Mix) – 5:58
"Strike It Up" (Hardcore Remix) – 3:20

12" maxi - Megaremix
"Strike It Up" (DJ Lelewel Mix) – 5:05
"Strike It Up" (Hardcore Remix) – 3:20
"Ride on Time" (The Bright On Mix) – 4:28
"Strike It Up" (Sensitive Mix) – 3:35

CD maxi - Megaremix
"Strike It Up" (DJ Lelewel Mix) – 5:05
"Ride on Time" (The Bright On Mix) – 4:28
"Strike It Up" (Hardcore Remix) – 3:20
"Strike It Up" (Sensitive Mix) – 3:35

Charts

Weekly charts

Year-end charts

Release history

See also
List of number-one dance singles of 1991 (U.S.)
List of RPM number-one dance singles of 1991

References

1990 songs
1991 singles
Black Box (band) songs
Deconstruction Records singles
English-language Italian songs
Polydor Records singles